Andrey Yuryevich Bronitsyn (born December 20, 1972 in Cheboksary) is a member for the LDPR of the State Duma of Russia.

He graduated from the Chuvash State University and the Volgo-Vyatsk Academy of State Service. From 2001 to 2002, Bronitsyn was a deputy on the Cheboksary City Council. He is a member of the Presidium of the Chuvash Republic State Council, and has served as the chairman of its Committee on Local Government. Currently, Bronitsyn is a member of the State Duma's Committee on Federal Affairs and Regional Policy.

References

External links
 Official website of the Chuvash Republic. Andrey Bronitsyn Profile 

1972 births
Living people
People from Cheboksary
Fourth convocation members of the State Duma (Russian Federation)
Liberal Democratic Party of Russia politicians